Union Township is one of fifteen  townships in Barton County, Missouri, USA.  As of the 2000 census, its population was 347.

Union Township was formed by means of merger, or "union" of existing townships, hence the name.

Geography
According to the USGS, it contains one cemetery, Bakers Grove.

The streams of Bucks Run Creek, Little Creek and Moores Branch run through this township.

References

 USGS Geographic Names Information System (GNIS)

External links
 US-Counties.com
 City-Data.com

Townships in Barton County, Missouri
Townships in Missouri